Madhavaram Botanical Garden is a botanical garden in Chennai, India, set up by the horticulture department of the Government of Tamil Nadu. The garden, the second botanical garden in Chennai after the Semmoli Poonga, is the largest botanical garden in the city.

History
The foundation stone for the garden was laid on 15 September 2010. The garden was built at a cost of  57.3 million.

The garden
The garden is located at the State horticulture farm in Madhavaram Milk Colony. The garden is broadly divided into sections for fruits, medicinal plants, indoor plants, cactus and ornamental arboretum, besides one for protected cultivation. The garden also has a small bridge has been built to attract birds from where visitors will get a view of the lake. The garden will have nearly 400 species of plants, including about 200 ornamental plants. A glasshouse similar to the one in the garden at Udhagamandalam will also be created, with different types of gardens, including herbal, flowers, bonsai and trellis gardens, in addition to mazes, a play area for children, cascades and many fountains. The garden will also have an open-air theatre with a capacity to seat nearly 150 people. There will also be a nursery outlet at the garden. There are also plans to create a section for 27 birthstars (nakshatram) as specified in the Hindu almanac.

As part of the project, the Horticulture Training Centre in Madhavaram will also be upgraded to Horticulture Management Institute at a cost of  39 million.

See also

 Semmoli Poonga
 Parks in Chennai
 List of botanical gardens in India

References

External links
 Parks page at Government of Tamil Nadu, Agriculture Department

Botanical gardens in Chennai
Urban public parks
Tourist attractions in Chennai
2013 establishments in Tamil Nadu